The Malone Freight Depot is a historic railroad freight depot located at Malone in Franklin County, New York.  It was built about 1852 by the Northern Railroad, and is a one-story, rectangular sandstone building with a low-pitched gable roof. It measures approximately 40 feet by 120 feet.

It was listed on the National Register of Historic Places in 1976.

See also
National Register of Historic Places listings in Franklin County, New York

References

Railway stations on the National Register of Historic Places in New York (state)
Transport infrastructure completed in 1852
Buildings and structures in Franklin County, New York
National Register of Historic Places in Franklin County, New York
1852 establishments in New York (state)
Former Rutland Railroad stations
Railway stations in the United States opened in 1852
Former railway stations in New York (state)